Quercus semecarpifolia is an Asian species of oak. It is native to the Himalayas and nearby mountains in Tibet, Afghanistan, India, Nepal, and Pakistan. It is classified in subgenus Cerris, section Ilex.

It has been grown in middle Europe, Western Germany, winter-hardiness zone 7, withstanding -14 °C, without any damages. It gives a good, showy bush to small tree with lush green leaves.
The epithet semecarpifolia refers to a resemblance between the leaves of this species and those of Semecarpus anacardium.

Fossil record
Fossils of Quercus semecarpifolia have been described from the fossil flora of Kızılcahamam district in Turkey, which is of early Pliocene age.

References

External links
line drawing, Flora of China Illustrations vol. 4, plate 368, figures 6-8 in lower half

semecarpifolia
Trees of Afghanistan
Trees of the Indian subcontinent
Trees of Tibet
Plants described in 1814
Taxa named by James Edward Smith